Expedition 49 was the 49th expedition to the International Space Station.

Anatoli Ivanishin, Kathleen Rubins and Takuya Onishi transferred from Expedition 48. Expedition 49 began upon the departure of Soyuz TMA-20M on September 6, 2016 and concluded upon the departure of Soyuz MS-01 in October 2016. The crew of Soyuz MS-02 then transferred to Expedition 50.

Crew

Notes
One US Segment based EVA was planned for Expedition 49, this was later postponed.

A soccer ball belonging to Ellison Onizuka who was killed in the Space Shuttle Challenger disaster was brought to the ISS by Shane Kimbrough.

References

External links

 NASA's Space Station Expeditions page

Expeditions to the International Space Station
2016 in spaceflight